Ware Cliffs are a set of long cliffs which stretch westwards from the town of Lyme Regis in Dorset to the Ware hamlet in the East Devon district of Devon, England.

The exposed rock formation dates to the early Jurassic period around 199-189 million years ago and many fossils have been found along the beaches.

References

Landforms of Devon
Jurassic Coast
Cliffs of England